Ochre, or ocher in American English, is a natural clay earth pigment, a mixture of ferric oxide and varying amounts of clay and sand. It ranges in colour from yellow to deep orange or brown. It is also the name of the colours produced by this pigment, especially a light brownish-yellow. A variant of ochre containing a large amount of hematite, or dehydrated iron oxide, has a reddish tint known as "red ochre" (or, in some dialects, ruddle).

The word ochre also describes clays coloured with iron oxide derived during the extraction of tin and copper.

Earth pigments
Ochre is a family of earth pigments, which includes yellow ochre, red ochre, purple ochre, sienna, and umber. The major ingredient of all the ochres is iron(III) oxide-hydroxide, known as limonite, which gives them a yellow colour.

 Yellow ochre, is a hydrated iron hydroxide (limonite) also called gold ochre.
 Red ochre, takes its reddish colour from the mineral hematite, which is an anhydrous iron oxide. 
 Purple ochre is identical to red ochre chemically but of a different hue caused by different light diffraction properties associated with a greater average particle size.
 Brown ochre, also FeO(OH), (goethite), is a partly hydrated iron oxide. 
Sienna contains both limonite and a small amount of manganese oxide (less than 5%), which makes it darker than ochre.
Umber pigments contain a larger proportion of manganese (5-20%), which makes them a dark brown.

When natural sienna and umber pigments are heated, they are dehydrated and some of the limonite is transformed into hematite, giving them more reddish colours, called burnt sienna and burnt umber. Ochres are non-toxic and can be used to make an oil paint that dries quickly and covers surfaces thoroughly. Modern ochre pigments often are made using synthetic iron oxide. Pigments which use natural ochre pigments indicate it with the name PY-43 (Pigment yellow 43) on the label, following the Colour Index International system.

Historical use in art and culture

Prehistory
Over recent decades, red ochre has played a pivotal role in discussions about the cognitive and cultural evolution of early modern humans during the African Middle Stone Age. In Africa, evidence for the processing and use of red ochre pigments  has been dated by archaeologists to around 300,000 years ago, the climax of the practice coinciding broadly with the emergence of Homo sapiens. Evidence of ochre's use in Australia is more recent, dated to 50,000 years ago, while new research has uncovered evidence in Asia that is dated to 40,000 years ago. 

Pieces of ochre engraved with abstract designs have been found at the site of the Blombos Cave in South Africa, dated to around 75,000 years ago. In Wales, the paleolithic burial called the Red Lady of Paviland from its coating of red ochre has been dated to around 33,000 years before present. Paintings of animals made with red and yellow ochre pigments have been found in paleolithic sites at Pech Merle in France (ca. 25,000 years old), and the cave of Altamira in Spain (ca. 16,500–15,000 BC). The cave of Lascaux has an image of a horse coloured with yellow ochre estimated to be 17,300 years old. Neolithic burials may have used red ochre pigments symbolically, either to represent a return to the earth or possibly as a form of ritual rebirth, in which the colour may symbolize blood and a hypothesized Great Goddess.

The Ancient Picts were said to paint themselves "Iron Red" according to the Gothic historian Jordanes. Frequent references in Irish myth to "red men" (Gaelic: Fer Dearg) make it likely that such a practice was common to the Celts of the British Isles, bog iron being particularly abundant in the midlands of Ireland.

Ochre has uses other than as paint: "tribal peoples alive today . . . use either as a way to treat animal skins or else as an insect repellent, to staunch bleeding, or as protection from the sun. Ochre may have been the first medicament."

Ancient Greece and Rome

Ochre was the most commonly used pigment for painting walls in the ancient Mediterranean world. In Ancient Greece, red ochre was called μίλτος, míltos (hence Miltiades: "red-haired" or "ruddy"). In ancient Athens when Assembly was called, a contingent of public slaves would sweep the open space of the Agora with ropes dipped in miltos: those citizens that loitered there instead of moving to the Assembly area would risk having their clothes stained with the paint. This prevented them from wearing these clothes in public again, as failure to attend the Assembly incurred a fine. 

In England, red ochre was also known as "raddle", "reddle", or "ruddle" and was used to mark sheep and can also be used as a waxy waterproof coating on structures. The reddle was sold as a ready-made mixture to farmers and herders by travelling workers called reddlemen.

In Classical antiquity, the finest red ochre came from a Greek colony on the Black Sea where the modern city of Sinop in Turkey is located. It was carefully regulated, expensive and marked by a special seal, and this colour was called sealed Sinope. Later the Latin and Italian name sinopia was given to wide range of dark red ochre pigments. Roman triumphators painted their faces red, perhaps to imitate the red-painted flesh of statues of the Gods. The Romans used yellow ochre in their paintings to represent gold and skin tones, and as a background colour. It is found frequently in the murals of Pompeii.

Ancient Egypt

In Ancient Egypt, yellow was associated with gold, which was considered to be eternal and indestructible. The skin and bones of the gods were believed to be made of gold. The Egyptians used yellow ochre extensively in tomb painting, though occasionally they used orpiment, which made a brilliant colour, but was highly toxic, since it was made with arsenic. In tomb paintings, men were always shown with brown faces, women with yellow ochre or gold faces.

Red ochre in Ancient Egypt was used as a rouge, or lip gloss for women. Ochre-coloured lines were also discovered on the Unfinished Obelisk at the northern region of the Aswan Stone Quarry, marking work sites. Ochre clays were also used medicinally in Ancient Egypt: such use is described in the Ebers Papyrus from Egypt, dating to about 1550 BC.

Australia

Ochre pigments are plentiful across Australia, especially the Western Desert, Kimberley and Arnhem Land regions, and occur in many archaeological sites. The practice of ochre painting has been prevalent among Indigenous Australian people for over 40,000 years. Pleistocene burials with red ochre date as early as 40,000 BP and ochre plays a role in expressing symbolic ideologies of the earliest arrivals to the continent. Ochre has been used for millennia by Aboriginal Australians for body decoration, sun protection, mortuary practices, cave painting, bark painting and other artwork, and the preservation of animal skins, among other uses. At Lake Mungo, in Western New South Wales, burial sites have been excavated and burial materials, including ochre-painted bones, have been dated to the arrival of people in Australia; "Mungo Man" (LM3) was buried sprinkled with red ochre at dates confidently estimated as at least 30,000 years B.P. and possibly as old as 60,000 years old. 

The National Museum of Australia has a large collection of samples of ochre from many sites across Australia.

New Zealand
The Māori people of New Zealand were found to be making extensive use of mineral ochre mixed with fish oil. Ochre was the predominant colouring agent used by Maori, and was used to paint their large waka taua (war canoe). Ochre prevented the drying out of the wood in canoes and the carvings of meeting houses; later missionaries estimated that it would last for 30 years. It was also roughly smeared over the face, especially by women, to keep off insects. Solid chunks of ochre were ground on a flat but rough surfaced rock to produce the powder.

Indigenous North America
In Newfoundland its use is most often associated with the Beothuk, whose use of red ochre led them to be referred to as "Red Indians" by the first Europeans to Newfoundland. The Beothuk may have also used yellow ochre to colour their hair.  It was also used by the Maritime Archaic as evidenced by its discovery in the graves of over 100 individuals during an archaeological excavation at Port au Choix. Its use was widespread at times in the Eastern Woodlands cultural area of Canada and the US; the Red Ocher people complex refers to a specific archaeological period in the Woodlands ca. 1000–400 BC. California Native Americans such as the Tongva and Chumash were also known to use red ochre as body paint. Researchers diving into dark submerged caves on Mexico’s Yucatan Peninsula have found evidence of an ambitious mining operation starting 12,000 years ago and lasting two millennia for red ochre.

Colonial North America 
In Newfoundland, red ochre was the pigment of choice for use in vernacular outbuildings and work buildings associated with the cod fishery. Deposits of ochre are found throughout Newfoundland, notably near Fortune Harbour and at Ochre Pit Cove. While earliest settlers may have used locally collected ochre, people were later able to purchase pre-ground ochre through local merchants, largely imported from England.
		
The dry ingredient, ochre, was mixed with some type of liquid raw material to create a rough paint. The liquid material was usually seal oil or cod liver oil in Newfoundland and Labrador, while Scandinavian recipes sometimes called for linseed oil. Red ochre paint was sometimes prepared months in advance and allowed to sit, and the smell of ochre paint being prepared is still remembered today.

Variations in local recipes, shades of ore, and type of oil used resulted in regional variations in colour. Because of this, it is difficult to pinpoint an exact shade or hue of red that would be considered the traditional "fishing stage red". In the Bonavista Bay area one man maintained that seal oil mixed with the ochre gave the sails a purer red colour, while cod liver oil would give a "foxy" colour, browner in hue.

Africa

Red ochre has been used as a colouring agent in Africa for over 200,000 years. Women of the Himba ethnic group in Namibia use a mix of ochre and animal fat for body decoration, to achieve a reddish skin colour. The ochre mixture is also applied to their hair after braiding. Men and women of the Maasai people in Kenya and Tanzania have also used ochre in the same way.

Renaissance
During the Renaissance, yellow and red ochre pigments were widely used in painting panels and frescoes. The colours vary greatly from region to region, depending upon whether the local clay was richer in yellowish limonite or reddish hematite. The red earth from Pozzuoli near Naples was a salmon pink, while the pigment from Tuscany contained manganese, making it a darker reddish brown called terra di siena, or sienna earth.

The 15th-century painter Cennino Cennini described the uses of ochre pigments in his famous treatise on painting. 

In early modern Malta, red ochre paint was commonly used on public buildings.

Modern history
The industrial process for making ochre pigment was developed by the French scientist Jean-Étienne Astier in the 1780s. He was from Roussillon in the Vaucluse department of Provence, and he was fascinated by the cliffs of red and yellow clay in the region. He invented a process to make the pigment on a large scale. First the clay was extracted from open pits or mines. The raw clay contained about 10 to 20 percent ochre. Then he washed the clay to separate the grains of sand from the particles of ochre. The remaining mixture was then decanted in large basins, to further separate the ochre from the sand. The water was then drained, and the ochre was dried, cut into bricks, crushed, sifted, and then classified by colour and quality. The best quality was reserved for artists' pigments.

In Britain, ochre was mined at Brixham, England. It became an important product for the British fishing industry, where it was combined with oil and used to coat sails to protect them from seawater, giving them a reddish colour. The ochre was boiled in great caldrons, together with tar, tallow and oak bark, the last ingredient giving the name of barking yards to the places where the hot mixture was painted on to the sails, which were then hung up to dry. In 1894, a theft case provided insights into the use of the pigment as a food adulterant in sausage roll production whereby the accused apprentice was taught to soak brown bread in red ochre, salt, and pepper to give the appearance of beef sausage for the filling.

As noted above, the industrial process for making ochre pigment was developed by the French scientist Jean-Étienne Astier in the 1780s, using the ochre mines and quarries in Roussillon, Rustrel, or Gargas in the Vaucluse department of Provence, in France. Thanks to the process invented by Astier and refined by his successors, ochre pigments from Vaucluse were exported across Europe and around the world. It was not only used for artists paints and house paints; it also became an important ingredient for the early rubber industry.

Ochre from Vaucluse was an important French export until the mid-20th century, when major markets were lost due to the Russian Revolution and the Spanish Civil War. Ochre also began to face growing competition from newly synthetic pigment industry. The quarries in Roussillon, Rustrel, the Mines of Bruoux closed one by one. Today, the last quarry in activity is in Gargas (Vaucluse) and belongs to the Société des Ocres de France.

In heraldry and vexillology 
Ochre, both red and yellow, appear as tinctures in South African heraldry; the national coat of arms, adopted in 2000, includes red ochre, while (yellow) ochre appears in the arms of the University of Transkei.

Ochre is also used as a symbol of Indigenous Australians, and appears on the Flag of the Northern Territory and on the flags of the Taungurung and Aṉangu people.

In popular culture

A reddleman named Diggory Venn was prominently described in Thomas Hardy's 1878 novel entitled The Return of the Native.

See also
 Falu red
 Female cosmetic coalitions
 Iron(III) oxide
 List of colors
 List of inorganic pigments
 Red Lady of Paviland
 Red pigments
 Banded Iron Formation

References

Citations

Sources 

 Helwig, K. Iron Oxide Pigments, in Artists’ Pigments, Berrie, B.H., Ed., National Gallery of Art Washington, 2007, pp. 38–109.
 Isabelle Roelofs and Fabien Petillion, La couleur expliquée aux artistes, Editions Eyrolles, (2012), .
 Philip Ball, Histoire vivante des couleurs (2001), Hazan Publishers, Paris, .
 Fuller, Carl; "Natural Colored Iron Oxide Pigments", pp. 281–6. In: Pigment Handbook, 2nd Edition. Lewis, P. (ed.). New York: John Wiley & Sons, 1988.
 Thomas, Anne Wall. Colors From the Earth, New York: Van Nostrand Reinhold, 1980.
 Wreschner, Ernst E. (October 1980) "Red Ochre and Human Evolution: A Case for Discussion." Current Anthropology 21:631–644. (Comments by various authors included.)
 Daniel V. Thompson (1956), The Materials and Techniques of Medieval Painting, Dover Publications, New York. .
 Lara Broecke, Cennino Cennini's Il Libro dell'Arte: a New English Translation and Commentary with Italian Transcription, Archetype, London, 2015, .
 David Bomford and Ashoka Roy (2009), A Closer Look- Colour, The National Gallery, London, .

 Dapschauskas, R., Göden, M. B, Sommer, C. and Kandel, A. W., 2022. The Emergence of Habitual Ochre Use in Africa and its
Significance for the Development of Ritual Behavior During the Middle Stone Age. Journal of World Prehistory
The Emergence of Habitual Ochre Use in Africa and its Significance for The Development of Ritual Behavior During The Middle Stone Age
 Watts, I. 2002. Ochre in the Middle Stone Age of southern Africa: Ritualised display or hide preservative? South African Archaeological Bulletin 57: 15-30.

External links 

Pigments through the ages
Red Ochre
Yellow ochre
Brown ochre
 A recipe for red ochre paint.
 Aboriginal Art Online Use of ochres in traditional Aboriginal art.
 National Museum of Australia Collection of ochre samples.
 Yellow ochre, Colourlex
 Red ochre, Colourlex
 Earth Pigments

Iron oxide pigments
Shades of brown
Iron ores